In physics, the stochastic vacuum model is a nonperturbative, phenomenological approach to derive cross section in quantum chromodynamics.

It is deemed impossible to calculate the vacuum averages of gauge-invariant quantities in QCD in a closed form, e.g. using the path integrals. But standard perturbation theory techniques don't work at distances, where the running coupling constant reaches 1.

The stochastic vacuum model is based on the approximation of nonperturbative QCD as a Gaussian process. It allows to calculate Wilson loops.

References

 Field correlators in QCD  A. Di Giacomo, H.G. Dosch, V.I. Shevchenko, Yu.A. Simonov, Phys. Repts. 372 319-368 (2002)
 Pomeron Physics and QCD  S. Donnachie, H.G. Dosch, P. Landshoff, O. Nachtmann C U P (2002)

Quantum chromodynamics